Dennis Waterman (1948–2022) was a British actor.

Dennis Waterman may also refer to:

 Dennis Waterman (Little Britain), a caricature of Waterman
 Dennis Waterman (poker player) (born 1948), American poker player and author